Nezamabad (also Romanized as Nez̧āmābād) is a village in Kuhpayeh Rural District Rural District, in the Central District of Bardaskan County, Razavi Khorasan Province, Iran. At the 2006 census, its population was 222, in 67 families.

References 

Populated places in Bardaskan County